Thermosphaeroma mendozai is a species of isopod in the family Sphaeromatidae. It is found in Mexico.

References

Sphaeromatidae
Articles created by Qbugbot
Crustaceans described in 2000